In the District of Columbia, lesbian, gay, bisexual, and transgender (LGBT) people enjoy the same rights as non-LGBT people. Along with the rest of the country, the District of Columbia recognizes and allows same-sex marriages. The percentage of same-sex households in the District of Columbia in 2008 was at 1.8%, the highest in the nation. This number had grown to 4.2% by early 2015.

The District of Columbia is regarded as very accepting and tolerant of LGBT people and same-sex relationships, with a 2017 Public Religion Research Institute poll indicating that 78% of residents supported same-sex marriage. The District also explicitly bans discrimination on the basis of sexual orientation and gender identity, and the use of conversion therapy on both minors and adults. Same-sex marriage legislation came into effect in March 2010, granting same-sex couples the right to marry, while domestic partnerships were legalized in 2002.

Legality of same-sex sexual activity

Recognition of same-sex relationships

Same-sex domestic partnerships were legalized by the Council in 1992 through the Health Benefits Expansion Act, but the Republican-controlled Congress refused to approve the measure until 2002, when a legislative rider preventing congressional approval of the Act's implementation was not included that year. Afterwards, the domestic partnership provisions of District law were incrementally expanded.

Same-sex marriage in the District of Columbia was legalized on December 18, 2009, when Mayor Adrian Fenty signed a bill passed by the Council of the District of Columbia on December 15, 2009. Following the signing, the measure entered a mandatory congressional review of 30 work days. Marriage licenses became available on March 3, 2010, and marriages began on March 9. The District became the only jurisdiction in the United States below the Mason–Dixon Line to allow same-sex couples to marry, until neighboring Maryland legalized same-sex marriage on January 1, 2013.

Domestic partnerships for same-sex and opposite-sex couples remain available as an option alongside marriage.

The District has provided benefits to same-sex partners of state employees since 2002.

Adoption and family planning
Same-sex couples are allowed to legally adopt children. Additionally, lesbian couples have access to in vitro fertilization (the non-gestational, non-genetic parent is automatically recognized as a legal parent of a child born via donor insemination), and gay couples are permitted to undertake gestational and traditional surrogacy arrangements under the same terms and conditions as different-sex couples.

On December 2, 2016, a legislative committee passed a bill, in a 9–0 vote, to allow commercial surrogacy contracts for all couples. On December 22, the Council of the District of Columbia passed the bill in its second reading unanimously by a vote of 13–0. Mayor Muriel Bowser signed the bill into law on February 15, 2017, and it went into effect on April 7, 2017, after the 30-day congressional review had passed.

Discrimination protections

In the D.C. Human Rights Act, sexual identity and gender identity and expression are among its defined protected traits. Discrimination against these traits is illegal in housing, in employment, in public accommodations, and in educational institutions.

In 1973, the D.C. government passed Title 34, an expansive human rights law that prohibited discrimination against many protected traits, which included sexual orientation. The city became among the first in the United States to offer discrimination protections to LGBT people. The law was incorporated into the D.C. Human Rights Act in 1977. In 1989, Congress passed an amendment to the Human Rights Act, named after Senator William L. Armstrong, that permitted religious schools to discriminate against students based on sexual orientation. The D.C. government successfully repealed the Armstrong Amendment in 2015. The act was also amended in 2006 to include gender identity and gender expression as protected traits.

In June 2012, the D.C. government passed the Youth Bullying Prevention Act, which requires businesses serving youth to have clear anti-bullying policies. The law specifically adds protections for bullying of LGBT youth and children of LGBT parents. It went into effect in September.

In late 2020, the D.C. government passed a law that amended the D.C. Human Rights Act to add discrimination protections for LGBT seniors and seniors living with HIV in long-term care facilities. The law went into effect in January 2021.

Hate crime law
The District's hate crime law covers both sexual orientation and gender identity. It provides additional penalties for crimes motivated by the victim's sexual orientation or gender identity, amongst other categories.

Gay panic defense
The gay panic defense, a controversial legal strategy that claims a victim's sexual orientation or gender identity and/or expression is to blame for a defendant's violence, including murder, has been illegal in the District of Columbia since May 2021. At the time of passage, eleven other states had already banned the defense.

In September 2019, members of the D.C. Council introduced two bills to alter the city code by abolishing the gay panic defense. The bills used the term "heat of passion" to describe the panic defense. The bills were referred to the council's Judiciary and Public Safety Committee to be merged and by November 2020, the committee advanced the resulting bill to the full council. Named the "Bella Evangelista and Tony Hunter Panic Defense Prohibition and Hate Crimes Response Amendment Act of 2020", it is named after two LGBT people who were killed in the district. Bella  Evangelista was a trans woman who was shot and killed by a 22-year-old man in 2003; Tony Hunter was a gay man who was killed during an assault by an 20-year-old man in 2008. The men charged in the two cases attempted to use the gay panic defense. The council unanimously passed the bill in December, and Mayor Muriel Bowser signed the bill in January 2021. It was reported in January that the government might lack the necessary funds to fully implement the law. The Associated Press reported in February that the attack on the U.S. Capitol had delayed several pieces of legislation from taking effect, including the law abolishing the gay panic defense. After many delays, the law went into effect in May 2021.

Civil litigation and other reforms
The District of Columbia has a pending law that would ban a judge or jury from devaluing personal injury or wrongful death lawsuits based on sexual orientation, gender identity, or gender expression, among other protected classes. The "Stormiyah Denson-Jackson Economic Damages Equity Act of 2022" was named after a 12-year-old Black girl who committed suicide at a D.C. boarding school and whose wrongful death lawsuit was devalued. It was passed by the D.C. Council in October 2022 and signed by Mayor Muriel Bowser in November.

Transgender rights

Gender on identity documents
On identity documents issued by the District of Columbia, transgender people can amend the gender marker to reflect their correct gender identity, and they do not need to undergo gender-affirming surgery to do so. Nonbinary people can amend the gender marker on their driver's license to the third gender option "X", but not for other identity documents.

In 2013, the D.C. government enacted the JaParker Deoni Jones Birth Certificate Equality Amendment Act of 2013, which allows D.C. residents to obtain a new birth certificate reflecting their gender identity so long as they provide a letter from a licensed health care provider certifying the resident's change in gender identity. It repealed an existing provision that required the resident to undergo gender-affirming surgery. The law was named after JaParker Deoni Jones, a trans woman who was murdered in 2012. D.C. became the sixth jurisdiction in the United Statesbehind Oregon, California, Vermont, Washington, and a portion of the federal governmentto ease name changing rules for transgender people.

In 2016, the D.C. government unanimously approved the "Death Certificate Gender Identity Recognition Amendment Act of 2016", a law that was proposed the year before but failed, which allows a transgender person's gender identity to be properly recorded on their death certificate. It went into effect in April 2017.

In June 2017, the D.C. Department of Motor Vehicles began offering a third gender option on driver's licenses and identification cards: "X". Whitman-Walker Health (WWH) and the National Center for Transgender Equality (NCTE) helped lead the initiative. The department issued the first-ever gender-neutral identification card in the United States to Shige Sakurai, an LGBT rights activist who drove WWH and the NCTE to lead the initiative. In September 2018, the D.C. government unanimously approved the Nonbinary Identification Cards Amendment Act of 2017, which codified the department's decision into law. The bill did not specify that the "X" option is available for birth certificates.

Prison
Before June 2021, the D.C. Department of Corrections housed transgender inmates in the men's or women's sections of the D.C. Jail based on their physical anatomy until a special housing committee determined their permanent placement. In May 2021, a trans woman backed by the D.C. chapter of the American Civil Liberties Union filed a discrimination lawsuit against the policy. She was quickly transferred to a women's cell and the Department of Corrections adopted a new policy. It stated that the department will house "Transgender, Intersex, or Gender Nonconforming inmates in male or female units based on their preference". The department also agreed to limit the time the inmates are held in solitary confinement prior to receiving their assignment.

Other reforms
In November 2022, a bill was signed into law by the Mayor subject to a 30 day Congressional review (that passed the DC council unanimously 13-0) which implements and codified namely - transgender individuals rights, abortion, sexual behavior between consenting adults, body anatomy, etc into DC code and also "legally provides both sanctuary and immunity to prosecution by other jurisdictions outside of DC with anti-gay, anti-transgender and anti-abortion policies towards individuals by law enforcement". California has similar legislation implemented.

Conversion therapy
Conversion therapy, the pseudoscientific practice of attempting to change a person's sexual orientation, gender identity, or gender expression to align with heterosexual and cisgender norms, is illegal in the District of Columbia since the 2010s. It was made illegal for minors in 2015 and for adults in 2019.

In December 2014, the D.C. government unanimously approved a ban on conversion therapy on minors. Despite pressure from groups that oppose LGBT rights, Congress did not introduce legislation overturning or blocking the bill. D.C. became the third U.S. jurisdictionbehind California and New Jerseyto enact a ban. The bill went into effect in March 2015.

In January 2019, the D.C. government extended conversion therapy ban to adults in a unanimous decision, specifically those that are not allowed to make their own medical decisions. Mary Cheh, the author of both bans, reported that the original ban had to be extended to adults that are not permitted or unable to make their own medical decisions. The bill went into effect in March 2019. It was the first of its kind to ban conversion therapy for adults, making the city's conversion therapy bans the most comprehensive in the United States.

Blood and tissue donation

Public opinion and demographics
A 2013 Williams Institute survey showed that 10% of the D.C. adult population identified as LGBT. This was the highest in the United States.

A 2017 Public Religion Research Institute poll found that 78% of D.C. residents supported same-sex marriage, while 17% were opposed and 5% were unsure. Additionally, 84% supported an anti-discrimination law covering sexual orientation and gender identity. 10% were opposed.

Summary table

See also
 List of LGBT members of the United States Congress

References

Rights
District of Columbia